This is an incomplete list of paintings by the French neoclassical painter Jean-Auguste-Dominique Ingres (1780-1867). Although he considered himself a classicist in the tradition of Nicolas Poussin and Jacques-Louis David and had a longstanding rivalry with Eugène Delacroix, some of his later works included elements of romanticism and orientalism. Despite his desire to be seen as a great history painter, traditionally viewed as the most important genre of painting, it is his portraits, both painted and drawn, rather than his history paintings that are recognized as his greatest legacy. His expressive distortions of form and space made him an important precursor of modern art, influencing Picasso, Matisse and other modernists.

In 1802 he made his Salon debut, and won the Prix de Rome for his painting The Ambassadors of Agamemnon in the tent of Achilles. By the time he departed in 1806 for his residency in Rome, his style—revealing his close study of Italian and Flemish Renaissance masters, particular Raphael—was fully developed, and would change little for the rest of his life. He was finally recognized at the Salon in 1824, when his Raphaelesque painting, The Vow of Louis XIII, was met with acclaim, and Ingres was acknowledged as the leader of the Neoclassical school in France.

List

Paris (1800-1806)
Source:

Italy (1806-1824)

Paris (1824-1834)

Rome (1834-1841)

Paris (1841-1867)

Notes

References

Sources
Wildenstein, Georges, ‘’Ingres’’. London: Phaidon Press, 1954.

Ingres
Paintings by Jean-Auguste-Dominique Ingres